Grouville Football Club is a football club based on the Channel Island of Jersey. They are affiliated to the Jersey Football Association and play in the Jersey Football Combination Championship.

References

External links
Official website

Football clubs in Jersey